Seheqenre Sankhptahi  was a pharaoh of the late 13th Dynasty, possibly the fifty-fourth or fifty-fifth king of this dynasty. He most likely reigned for a short period over the Memphite region during the mid-17th century BC, some time between 1663 BC and 1649 BC.



Attestions 
Pharaoh Seheqenre Sankhptahi is named and represented on the stele of royal sealer and overseer of sealers Nebsumenu dating to Year One of his reign. The origin of the stele is not known for certain—the stele was acquired in 1999 by the National Archaeological Museum of Spain from a private collector. However, Kim Ryholt notes that it depicts Sankhptahi offering oil to the god Ptah "He who is south of his wall" (rsy-snb=f) and to Anubis "Lord of bandagers" (nb wtyw), both of which are epithets from the Memphite region. Ryholt concludes that Seheqenre Sankhptahi probably reigned over Memphis and thus belongs to the 13th dynasty, which had control over the region at the time. Furthermore, Ryholt suggests that Sankhptahi may himself have been born in Memphis, as indicated by his theophorous name based on Ptah, the god of the city.

According to the latest reading of the Turin canon by Ryholt, Seheqenre Sankhptahi is attested there, on column 8 line 25, which contains the damaged prenomen [?]ḳ-n-Rˁ. Ryholt remarks that Seheqenre is the only king of the period whose name matches these signs and reads [S.ḥ]ḳ-n-Rˁ, Seheqenre on the Turin canon.

Ryholt finally points to a blue-green steatite cylinder seal of unknown provenance and bearing the golden horus name Sekhaenptah, S.ḫˁ-n-ptḥ, He whom Ptah causes to appear, as maybe belonging to Seheqenre Sankhptahi. Percy Newberry simply dates the seal to "about the end of the Middle Kingdom" without further identification of its owner. The seal is probably lost: originally in the Timmins collection housed in the Metropolitan Museum of Art, it is now reportedly missing from the museum.

Family 
A stele of unknown provenance, although probably Memphite in origin, and dated on stylistic grounds to the Second Intermediate Period presents a list of members of a royal family and gives the king's son name as [?]-ptḥ-i. If this prince is the future pharaoh Seheqenre Sankhptahi as Ryholt proposes, then pharaoh Se[...]kare is his father and Minemsaes and Sit[...] are his sisters. The stele is housed in the Egyptian Museum (CG20600).

Further reading
Meeks, Dimitri, "Une stèle de donation de la Deuxième Période intermédiaire" ENIM 2, 2009, pp. 129–154.

References

17th-century BC Pharaohs
Pharaohs of the Thirteenth Dynasty of Egypt